Quinn Shephard (born February 28, 1995) is an American actress, film director, producer, screenwriter and film editor. She played the roles of Donna Malone in the Christmas comedy Unaccompanied Minors and Morgan Sanders in the television series Hostages. In 2017, her feature film directorial debut, Blame (which she also wrote, produced, edited, and starred in), screened at several film festivals and earned critical attention.

Early life 
Shephard grew up in Metuchen, New Jersey and the surrounding New York area. She attended Metuchen High School, which was used to film scenes from her movie Blame.

Career 
Shephard's big screen debut was in the 2001 French film Harrison's Flowers at the age of five. Shephard's first starring role was in the holiday comedy feature film Unaccompanied Minors. Shephard and her co-stars were nominated for Best Young Ensemble in a Feature Film at the 29th Young Artist Awards. She later appeared in the comedy film Assassination of a High School President (2008) and the horror film Sweet, Sweet Lonely Girl (2016).

Shephard has also appeared on television. In 2013, she played the recurring role of Morgan Sanders in the CBS thriller series Hostages. From 2014 to 2015, she portrayed Claire Mahoney in the fourth season of Person of Interest. Shephard has played guest roles in several television series, including Law & Order: Special Victims Unit (2011), Made in Jersey (2012), The Blacklist (2013), and Believe (2014).

In 2015, she was the recipient of the Rising Star Award at the Garden State Film Festival. In 2018, she appeared in the film The Miseducation of Cameron Post, which had its world premiere at the Sundance Film Festival; it won the Grand Jury Prize for U.S. Drama, the festival's highest honor.

Directorial debut
Shephard developed the script for her first feature film, Blame, for several years. In 2015, after her financier fell through during the first week of shooting, Shephard partially self-financed Blame using money from her college fund. The film was shot in 19 days, and Shephard produced it with her mother, Laurie Shephard. Shephard also starred in the film as Abigail Grey, alongside Chris Messina, Nadia Alexander, and Tate Donovan.

Blame screened at the Tribeca Film Festival, making Shephard the youngest female director to debut a film there. It was nominated for several awards at Tribeca and won the award for Best Actress in a U.S. Narrative Feature (for Alexander's performance). The film received generally positive reviews from critics; it holds an 80% rating on Rotten Tomatoes, while on Metacritic it holds a 54/100 rating. IndieWire called it a "solid debut", while writing that, though it "isn't fully realized", it establishes Shephard as "someone to watch". Glenn Kenny of The New York Times described the film as "earnest but underdeveloped". Filmmaker called the film "a poignant and incisive examination of modern American adolescence." The Hollywood Reporter called it "a mixed bag of a directorial debut".

Personal life 
Shephard identifies as queer. Since 2015, she has been in a relationship with her Blame co-star Nadia Alexander. In September 2021, on the last day of shooting Not Okay, Shephard accepted Alexander's marriage proposal.

Filmography

Film

Filmmaking credits

Television

References

External links 
 
 

1995 births
American film actresses
Living people
21st-century American actresses
American television actresses
Actresses from New Jersey
American child actresses
Metuchen High School alumni
People from Metuchen, New Jersey
American queer actresses
LGBT people from New Jersey